Nightstick or night stick may refer to:
 Club (weapon), a short staff or stick wielded as a weapon
 Baton (law enforcement), a compliance tool and defensive weapon used by law-enforcement officers
 Nightstick (band), an American sludge metal band from Weymouth, Massachusetts
 Nightstick (film), a 1987  Canadian-American made for television action film
 Nightstick (Transformers), a character from the Transformers franchise